Ray Windsor (born 11 August 1972) is a former Australian rules footballer who played with the Brisbane Bears in the AFL.
He was also a member of Central Districts losing Grand Final Team of 1995.

External links

1972 births
Living people
Brisbane Bears players
Central District Football Club players
Western Magpies Australian Football Club players
Australian rules footballers from Queensland